Miejsce Odrzańskie  is a village in the administrative district of Gmina Cisek, within Kędzierzyn-Koźle County, Opole Voivodeship, in south-western Poland.
After World War II the city was ceded to the Peoples Republic of Poland.

The village has a population of 328.

Notable people
Günther von Reibnitz (1894–1983)

Sex asymmetry
It became famous since it hasn't had single male newborns for almost a decade. Despite that, a variety of scientists said it is just a coincidence, helped by the particular birth rate of the village being lower than 1 birth per year.

See also
Holy Trinity Church, Miejsce Odrzańskie

Gallery

References

Villages in Kędzierzyn-Koźle County